Rivière-Bleue is a municipality in Quebec with more or less 1500 inhabitants. The municipality is located in the Bas-Saint-Laurent region on the border of the province of New-Brunswick and Canada–United States border with Maine.

History 
The first settlers arrived in 1860. They were in fact pioneers from Scottish descents coming from the United States and others from Saint-François-de-Madawaska, New Brunswick.  The Catholic mission was founded in 1874 under the name of Saint-Joseph-de-la-Rivière-Bleue, and the postal office opened in 1910. The Catholic parish was erected and the parish municipality created officially in 1914 under the name of the mission. In 1920, the village municipality is created under the same name. The parish municipality and the village municipality are merged in 1975 under the name of Rivière-Bleue.

The National Transcontinental Railway and the station were crucial to the village’s development: travellers, goods, and forestry and agricultural products came and went by rail. In 1913, the first station was built in Tarte, along a sidetrack named in honour of Israël Tarte, journalist, politician and Minister of Transportation under Wilfrid Laurier. The name Tarte Siding is still in use. On January 4, 1914, the first train stopped at the station, on its way from Edmundston, New Brunswick. In 1915, the building was carried a mile down the tracks, to Rivière-Bleue. There, the station was expanded to house the family of Arthur Aubut, the first station master to live in Rivière-Bleue. Until the end of World War II, the railway was the only way to travel outside the village in the winter, and the telegraph, which was then a railway monopoly, was the fastest means of communication.

See also
 List of municipalities in Quebec
 Témiscouata Regional County Municipality, (RCM)
 Crocs River, a stream
 Beau Lake, a lake

References

External links
 
Rivière-Bleue Official website
The Old Rivière-Bleue Train Station
Commission de toponymie of Québec
Statistics Canada
Ministère des Affaires municipales, des Régions et de l'Occupation du territoire du Québec

Municipalities in Quebec
Incorporated places in Bas-Saint-Laurent